The 1956 edition of the Campeonato Carioca kicked off on July 21, 1956 and ended on December 23, 1956. It was organized by FMF (Federação Metropolitana de Futebol, or Metropolitan Football Federation). Twelve teams participated. Vasco da Gama won the title for the 11th time. no teams were relegated.

System
The tournament would be disputed in a double round-robin format, with the team with the most points winning the title.

Championship

Top Scores

References

Campeonato Carioca seasons
Carioca